WYTI is a Full Service formatted broadcast radio station licensed to Rocky Mount, Virginia, serving Rocky Mount and Franklin County, Virginia.  WYTI is owned and operated by WYTI, Inc.

In March, 2017 WYTI started being relayed on 250 watt translator W283CQ on 104.5 MHz.

References

External links
 WYTI AM 1570 Online

YTI
Rocky Mount, Virginia
Radio stations established in 1957
Full service radio stations in the United States